Saint-Cyr-la-Rivière is a commune in the Essonne department in Île-de-France in northern France.

Inhabitants of Saint-Cyr-la-Rivière are known as Saint-Cyriens.

Geography
The village lies on the left bank of the Éclimont, which forms the commune's northeastern border and flows into the Juine, which flows northeast through the northwestern part of the commune.

See also
Communes of the Essonne department

References

External links

Mayors of Essonne Association 

Communes of Essonne